Choreutis sexfasciella is a moth in the family Choreutidae. It was described by Sauber in 1902. It is found in Sri Lanka, Japan (Ogasawara), Taiwan, the Philippines and on Java.

References

Natural History Museum Lepidoptera generic names catalog

Choreutis
Moths described in 1902